Bishamber Singh (born 8 November 1969) is a member of the Haryana Legislative Assembly from the BJP representing the Bawani Khera Vidhan sabha Constituency in Haryana.

References 

Living people
Bharatiya Janata Party politicians from Haryana
People from Bhiwani district
Haryana MLAs 2019–2024
Haryana MLAs 2014–2019
1969 births